Oliver George McGee III (October 28, 1957 – June 7, 2020) was an American analyst, strategist, professor of engineering, and author in the United States. He wrote about his switch from being a Democrat to a Republican and about being a Republican in the "age of Obama" in his book Jumping the Aisle. He provided public advocacy on capital, technology, and U.S. competitiveness strategies for several political campaigns including Hillary for President 2008, McCain-Palin 2008, Romney-Ryan 2012, and Trump-Pence 2016 campaigns.

Early life 
Oliver was born on October 28, 1957. The oldest of four children to Oliver McGee Jr. and Jean McGee (nee Arnold), in 1961, his father became the first African American to join the Cincinnati Fire Department. His parents divorced in 1970, with his father remarrying in 1988. Oliver III would follow in his father's groundbreaking footsteps, earning his Ph.D and M.B.A., as well as several certifications.

Education
McGee graduated from Ohio State University with a bachelor's degree in civil engineering in 1981. He was the drum major for The Ohio State University Marching Band. At the University of Arizona he received a Master of Science in civil engineering in 1983 and a Doctorate in engineering mechanics (with a minor in aerospace engineering) in 1988.

In 2004, he received a Master of Business Administration degree from the University of Chicago Booth School of Business.

Career
McGee was a Professor and former Department Chair (2016–17) of Mechanical Engineering at Texas Tech University. He taught at Ohio State University, Georgia Tech, and was a visiting professor at MIT. He was formerly professor of mechanical engineering and former Vice President for Research and Compliance at Howard University, serving as the chief research officer. He was Senior Vice President for Academic Affairs for the United Negro College Fund (2006). McGee was a Professor and former Chair (2001–2005) of the Department of Civil & Environmental Engineering & Geodetic Science at Ohio State University.

McGee was the former United States Deputy Assistant Secretary of Transportation for Technology Policy (1999–2001) at the U.S. Department of Transportation and former Senior Policy Advisor (1997–1999) in The White House Office of Science and Technology Policy.

Honors 
American Council on Education Fellow (2012–13)
Certificate of Professional Development at The Wharton School (2001)
 Carnegie Foundation for the Advancement of Teaching State of Georgia Professor of the Year (1995)
 National Science Foundation Presidential Young Investigator Award (1991)

Death 
McGee died on Sunday, June 7, 2020, at the age of 62 years. In 2020, his niece mentioned in a GoFundMe memorial that his cause of death was stage 4 cancer.

References 

1957 births
2020 deaths
American activists
American television personalities
People from Cincinnati
Ohio State University alumni
University of Arizona alumni
University of Chicago alumni
University of Pennsylvania alumni